Sericomyia lappona, is a species of hoverfly. It is widespread throughout the Palearctic.

Description
External images For terms see Morphology of Diptera
Wing length 9·5–14 mm. Knob of halteres black. Legs reddish, femorae darkened at base. Tergites 3 and 4 bands whitish-yellow and narrow (less than 1/3 tergite length), and with a short median
interruption. Scutellum reddish. See references for determination

Distribution
Palearctic Fennoscandia South to the Pyrenees. Ireland East through North Europe, Central Europe and South Europe (North Italy, Yugoslavia) into European Russia and through Siberia and the Russian Far East to the Pacific coast (Sakhalin Island).

Biology
Habitat: Quercus, Betula and Pinus woodland, Salix carr, fen, bog and moorland. Flies May to September.

References

Diptera of Europe
Eristalinae
Flies described in 1758
Taxa named by Carl Linnaeus